Palazzo Pfanner is a palace and a garden  in Lucca, Italy, now converted into a museum of art and artifacts. Originally known as the Palazzo Controni, the building dates to 1667, and is notable mainly for its fine garden, attributed to Filippo Juvarra, and an interesting external stairway with loggia. 

Its principal salon contains frescoes by Scorsini and De Santi (early to mid 18th century), as well as a collection of surgical instruments gathered by Dr. Pietro Pfanner (1864–1935).

References

Bibliography 
 Bedini, Gilbert (2006). The Villas of Lucca. Melbourne: Images Publishing.

External links 

Official website

Houses completed in 1660
Pfanner
Gardens in Tuscany
Baroque architecture in Tuscany
Museums in Lucca
Historic house museums in Italy
1660 establishments in Italy